Each winner of the 1969 Governor General's Awards for Literary Merit was selected by a panel of judges administered by the Canada Council for the Arts.

English Language
Fiction: Robert Kroetsch, The Studhorse Man

Poetry or Drama: George Bowering, Rocky Mountain Foot and The Gangs of Kosmos

Poetry or Drama: Gwendolyn MacEwen, The Shadow-Maker

French Language
Fiction: Louise Maheux-Forcier, 

Poetry or Drama: Jean-Guy Pilon, 

Non-Fiction: Michel Brunet, 

Governor General's Awards
Governor General's Awards
Governor General's Awards